Diocaesarea is a historic name for the town of Sepphoris in Israel.

Diocaesarea or Diocæsarea or Diocaesareia or Diokaisareia may also refer to:
Diocaesarea (Cappadocia), a town of ancient Cappadocia
Diocaesarea (Isauria), a town of ancient Cilicia Trachea, and later Isauria
Diocaesarea a historic name of Anazarbus, now in Turkey
Diocaesarea a historic name of Ceretapa, now in Turkey